Stephen Desberg (born 10 September 1954 in Brussels) is a Belgian writer of comics. In 2010, he was the 10th bestselling author of comics in France, with 412,000 copies of all his comics together sold that year.

Biography
Stephen Desberg was born in Brussels in 1954 as the third child of an American lawyer from Cleveland and a French mother who taught him French at the Sorbonne after the Liberation of Paris. They settled in Brussels when Stephen's father became responsible for the distribution of Metro-Goldwyn-Mayer films in Belgium, Luxemburg and the Netherlands. After finishing college two years late, he studied law at the Université Libre de Bruxelles, but didn't finish his studies.

His youth was mainly dominated by American movies, but he also enjoyed the weekly Spirou magazine with series like Buck Danny or the works of Raymond Macherot. He only discovered the authors who published in the main competitor Tintin magazine much later. He became a regular at the comics shop of Michel Deligne, who also republished classic comics and a fanzine. After Desberg published his first work here, Deligne introduced him to Maurice Tillieux, one of the major authors of Spirou at the time. At first, he offered some ideas and synopses to Tillieux for series like Jess Long and Tif et Tondu, but he eventually moved to full scenarios for Tif et Tondu, drawn by Will. He started working for a number of other Spirou authors, including Benn, Pierre Seron, Raymond Macherot and Eric Maltaite (the son of Will).

His first success came in 1980 with Billy the Cat, drawn by Stéphane Colman. He also created 421 with Eric Maltaite, in 1983 Arkel with Marc Hardy, and in 1988 Jimmy Tousseul with Daniel Desorgher. Despite all this, he was simultaneously but unsuccessfully trying to become a professional musician.

By the late 1980s, he moved from the young adolescent comics more towards the adult comics and graphic novel market, with 2 comics with Will and a series with Johan De Moor, the son of Bob De Moor, for Casterman, his first move away from publisher Dupuis. After some more short-lived series and collaborations, he started IR$ with Bernard Vrancken. In 2000 starts Le Scorpion with Enrico Marini. Both series became a considerable success. In the following decade, Desberg started a considerable number of new series with multiple artists and publishers, making him by 2010 one of the major writers of contemporary Franco-Belgian comics.

Bibliography
Tif et Tondu, 1978–1991, 14 albums, art by Will, Dupuis
Envahisseurs sur Janus, 1981, 1 album, art by Xavier Musquera, Michel Deligne
Les Centaures, 1982, 1 album, art by Pierre Seron, Dupuis
Mic mac Adam, 1982–2000, 6 albums, art by Benn, Dupuis and Fleurus
421, 1983–1992, 11 albums, art by Eric Maltaite, Dupuis
Arkel, 1985–1993, 4 albums, art by Marc Hardy, Dupuis
Gaspard de la nuit, 1987–1991, 4 albums, art by Johan De Moor, Casterman
Le jardin des désirs, 1988, 1 album, art by Will, Dupuis
Jimmy Tousseul, 1989–2000, 12 albums, art by Daniel Desorgher, Dupuis
La 27e Lettre, 1990, 1 album, art by Will, Dupuis
Billy the Cat, 1990–2003, 8 albums, art by Stéphane Colman, Dupuis
la vache, 1992–1999, 8 albums, art by Johan De Moor, Casterman
L'Appel de l'enfer, 1993, 1 album, art by Will, P&T Productions
Carmen Lamour, 1993, 1 album, art by Eric Maltaite, P&T Productions
Equator, 1994, 1 album, art by Dany, Dargaud
Jess Long, 1994, 1 album, art by Arthur Piroton, Dupuis
L'étoile du désert, 1996, 2 albums, art by Enrico Marini, Le Lombard
Le Sang Noir, 1996–1998, 4 albums, art by Bernard Vrancken, Le Lombard
Le Crépuscule des Anges, 1998–1999, 2 albums, art by Henri Reculé, Casterman
Le Cercle des Sentinelles, 1998–2000, 4 albums, art by Philippe Wurm, Casterman
IR$, 1999-..., 12 albums, art by Bernard Vrancken, Le Lombard
Le Scorpion, 2000-..., 9 albums, art by Enrico Marini, Dargaud
Lait entier, 2001–2002, 2 albums, art by Johan De Moor, Casterman
Tosca, 2001–2003, 3 albums, art by Francis Vallès, Glénat
Les Immortels, 2001–2005, 5 albums, art by Henri Reculé, Glénat
Mayam, 2003–2007, 4 albums, art by Daniel Koller, Dargaud
Le Dernier Livre de la Jungel, 2004–2007, 4 albums, art by Johan De Moor and Henri Reculé, Le Lombard
Rafales, 2005–2008, 4 albums, art by Francis Vallès, Le Lombard
Black Op, 2005-..., 6 albums, art by Hugues Labiano, Dargaud
Cassio, 2007-..., 4 albums, art by Henri Reculé, Le Lombard
Empire USA, 2008, 6 albums, collective work (with a.o. Enrico Marini, Henri Reculé, Griffo), Dargaud
Sienna, 2008-..., 2 albums, art by Chetville, Bamboo
Ange & diablesses, 2009, 2 albums, art by Marc Hardy, Dupuis
IR$ - All Watcher, 2009-..., 6 albums, art by various artists, Le Lombard
Sherman, 2011, 6 albums, art by Griffo, Le Lombard

Awards
1991: Youth Award at the Angoulême International Comics Festival for Billy The Cat
1995: Humour Award at the Angoulême International Comics Festival for La vache
2003: nominated for the Audience Award at the Angoulême International Comics Festival for Le Scorpion
2005: nominated for the Youth Award at the Angoulême International Comics Festival for Le Scorpion

Notes

External links
Biography at Lambiek's Comiclopedia
Official site of Le Scorpion, with biography of the authors

1954 births
Living people
Writers from Brussels
Belgian comics writers